Black Rock Mining Limited (former names: Mokuti Mining Limited and Green Rock Energy Limited) is an Australian mining company. It develops the Mahenge Graphite Project in Tanzania which is the world fourth largest graphite resource.  Its chief executive officer is John de Vries.

Between 2005 and 2015, the company explored and developed geothermal energy resources. In South Australia, the company had seven geothermal exploration licences totalling  and two licence applications surrounding Olympic Dam Mine and the Roxby Downs township. The company also had a geothermal project in Hungary.

In 2014, it sold its Ocean Hill hydrocarbon block application in the North Perth Basin to Eneabba Gas and focused to graphite assets.

References

External links
 

Mining companies of Australia